The Vancouver Men's Chorus is a non-profit choir. Composed of gay men and their friends, the chorus aims to promote community spirit and a positive image of the gay community. The Chorus is a member of the Vancouver Cultural Alliance, the British Columbia Choral Federation and of GALA Choruses, an association of over one hundred men's, women's, and mixed choruses from the United States, Canada, Europe and Australia, dedicated to providing leadership and inspiration to the gay and lesbian movement through excellence in the choral arts.

VMC History
In 1981, the first gay choir, the San Francisco Gay Men's Chorus, toured the United States and several men from Vancouver drove the three hours south to Seattle to hear them. On their return, they decided to start a chorus of their own performing their first concert in December of that same year. They officially became the first gay chorus in Canada, a founding member of GALA and the first international gay chorus in that organization.

Under the continuing direction of conductor Willi Zwozdesky, the chorus has achieved national prominence through performances across Canada including visits to Ottawa, Toronto, Calgary, Victoria, and Montreal, and through radio broadcasts on CBC.

Concert performances in the United States have included San Francisco, Minneapolis, Seattle, Portland, Washington, D.C., Denver, San Diego, and San Jose.

In addition, broadcasts of its 1995 recording Making Spirits Bright, the 1992 recording Signature and the 2006 release of Encore have increased national exposure.

In 1991, The Canada Council recognized the chorus for its artistry, and in 1994, the chorus was selected as one of five national finalists in the CBC Amateur Choir Competition. In addition to its mainstage concerts that year, the chorus recorded J. Douglas Dodd's Symphony of Sound and Light with the Vancouver Symphony Orchestra, Elektra Women's Choir, and the Vancouver Children's Choir for broadcast on Parliament Hill during the summer months.

At the core of the Chorus’ achievements stands its contribution to the creation of new repertoire for men's and mixed voices. Custom-made arrangements, notably by Willi Zwozdesky, Stephen Smith, and other Canadian arrangers are a hallmark of VMC programming. As a result of this and the Chorus' wide-ranging concertizing, VMC arrangements are now heard in concert halls around the world. Original commissions have included Vancouver composers Michael Conway Baker, Ramona Luengen, Anita Perry, Rupert Lang, Stephen Smith, and Willi Zwozdesky, and Toronto composer Eleanor Daley. In 2000, the Chorus was also among the original commissioning choruses of Alan Shorter's setting of the children's story Oliver Button is a Sissy.

The Chorus is a member of the British Columbia Choral Federation and of GALA Choruses (an association of over one hundred men's, women's, and mixed choruses from the United States, Canada, Europe, and Australia, dedicated to providing leadership and inspiration to the gay and lesbian movement through excellence in the choral arts).

Sub Group

Synergy
Synergy was formed in October 1998 as a small ensemble of the Vancouver Men's Chorus, under the direction of the VMC's resident accompanist, Stephen Smith. Over the last decade, the select 12-voice a cappella group has been singing in a variety of styles ranging from renaissance to jazz, and from motets to Motown. In addition to their regular appearances in VMC mainstage concerts, Synergy has performed at festivals in Vancouver, Chicago, San Jose, Toronto, Montreal, and London, England; in self-produced concerts and as guests of other ensembles; in benefits for gay and lesbian organizations in Vancouver, Victoria, and Kamloops; and at scores of parties, weddings, and community events. In 2008 they released their first CD, entitled Synergy: Songs of Nature, Love, and Celebration.

In addition to their regular appearances in VMC mainstage concerts, Synergy has performed at festivals in Chicago (1999), San Jose (2001), Toronto (2002), and Montreal (2004); in self-produced concerts with guests Synchronicity (2000) and Bryant Olender (2005); as guests of Pandora's Vox (2001) and the Rainbow Concert Band (2003); in benefits for local gay and lesbian organizations in Victoria (2004) and Kamloops (2001, 2002, 2005, 2007); at the first annual VoxFest (2003); and at scores of parties, weddings, community events, and fundraisers.

Synergy's final performance was on July 28, 2013 at the wedding of two of its members.

Discography
Signature (1992) 
Making Spirits Bright (1994)
Elements (2002)
Encore (2006)
Making Spirits Bright Again (2008)

Outreach Concerts
The VMC performs local community outreach concerts regularly at various benefits, conferences, and other occasions that fall within its mandate.  The chorus also performs outreach concerts to audiences and communities farther from Vancouver, but still relatively close by.   
 
Recent community outreach concerts included the following:
Nanaimo (2009)
Port Coquitlam (2008)
Surrey (2007)
Saltspring Island (2006)
Victoria (2005)

Notes 

Canadian choirs
Gay culture in Canada
Gay men's choruses